Roueche House is an historic home located at Meadville, Crawford County, Pennsylvania.  It was built in 1899, and is a 2½-story, irregular frame dwelling in the Queen Anne style. It is clad in brick, clapboard, fishscale shingles, and pebble-dash panels.  Its facade features a large curved brick chimney, multi-gabled and hipped roofs, balconies and round projecting porch, and a three-story hexagonal tower.

It was added to the National Register of Historic Places in 1982.

References

External links
Owner's website

Houses on the National Register of Historic Places in Pennsylvania
Queen Anne architecture in Pennsylvania
Houses completed in 1899
Houses in Crawford County, Pennsylvania
Meadville, Pennsylvania
National Register of Historic Places in Crawford County, Pennsylvania